A herpetarium is a zoological exhibition space for reptiles and amphibians, most commonly a dedicated area of a larger zoo. A herpetarium which specializes in snakes is an ophidiarium or serpentarium, which are more common as stand-alone entities also known as snake farms. Many snake farms milk snakes for venom for medical and scientific research.

Notable herpetariums

Alice Springs Reptile Centre in Alice Springs, Australia
Armadale Reptile Centre in Perth, Australia
Australian Reptile Park in Somersby, Australia
Chennai Snake Park Trust in Chennai, India
Crocodiles of the World in Brize Norton, UK
Crocosaurus Cove in Darwin, Australia
Clyde Peeling's Reptiland in Allenwood, Pennsylvania
Kentucky Reptile Zoo in Slade, Kentucky
The LAIR at the Los Angeles Zoo in Los Angeles, California
Serpent Safari in Gurnee, Illinois
Saint Louis Zoo Herpetarium in St. Louis, Missouri
Staten Island Zoo Serpentarium in New York City, New York
World of Reptiles at the Bronx Zoo in New York City, New York

See also
Herpetoculture
Bill Haast (founder of Miami Serpentarium)

References 
 Murphy, James B., Herpetological History of the Zoo and Aquarium World, Krieger Publishing Company, Malabar, Florida, 2007. 

Reptiles and humans
Zoos
Herpetology
Buildings and structures used to confine animals